The Ilha Grande State Park is a state park in the state of Rio de Janeiro, Brazil.

Location

The Ilha Grande State Park is on the island of Ilha Grande off the south coast of Rio de Janeiro near the border with São Paulo, in the Angra dos Reis municipality.
Although within the area of the Bocaina Mosaic of protected areas, as of 2016 the park was not among the mosaic's conservation units. 
It is within the  Tamoios Environmental Protection Area, created in 1982.

Environment

The island is made up of mountains with small plains irrigated with dozens of streams of clear water, with pools, rapids and waterfalls.
More than 90% of the park is covered by Atlantic Forest.
There are also restingas, heaths and mangroves.
The island has eight beautiful beaches, separated by section of rocky shore and cliffs that plunge into the sea.
The surrounding marine habitat supports a rich marine life.
There are archaeological remains of tools and middens from 3,000 years ago.
Of more recent date there is an old lighthouse, aqueduct, dam and hydroelectric power plant, the ruins of two prisons, stone paths from the colonial era and several ruined farmhouses.

The state park is administered by the Instituto Estadual do Ambiente of Rio de Janeiro.
Any predatory actions that could harm the environment are forbidden, including cutting trees, pulling up seedlings, hunting and fishing, feeding or harming animals, agriculture, or residential, commercial or industrial occupation.
The main beaches are supervised.
The island still suffers from problems such as growing numbers of visitors, poor garbage collection, lack of sewage treatment, illegal construction and predatory hunting and fishing.

History

The Ilha Grande State Park was created on 28 July 1971 to preserve the natural resources and support tourism on the Ilha Grande.
It was officially established with land use regulated on 25 August 1978.
It was expanded to cover  in 2007, or 62.5% of the island.

Notes

Sources

It is part of the  Bocaina Mosaic, created in 2006.

State parks of Brazil
Protected areas of Rio de Janeiro (state)
1971 establishments in Brazil
Angra dos Reis